Vivienne Margaret 'Meg' Bateman (born 1959) is a Scottish academic, poet and short story writer. She is best known for her works written in Scottish Gaelic; however, she has also published work in the English language.

Education and career

Bateman was born in Edinburgh and grew up in the New Town area of the city. She studied Celtic at the University of Aberdeen and completed a PhD in medieval Scottish Gaelic language religious poetry. She taught Scottish Gaelic at the University of Aberdeen between 1991 and 1998 before moving to Isle of Skye to teach at the Gaelic college, Sabhal Mòr Ostaig. She has also taught Scottish Gaelic at the University of Edinburgh and is an Honorary Senior Lecturer at the University of St Andrews.

Bateman's first collection of poems, Òrain Ghaoil (Love Songs) was published in 1990 and her second, Aotromachd agus dàin eile (Lightness) was published in 1997. Both her first and second collections focus on human relationships and the idealised idea of love. Her third collection, Soirbheas (Air Wind) was published in 2007.

In 2011, Bateman's first published Scottish Gaelic short story, entitled Chanadh gun d'chur i às dha, appeared in the short story collection Saorsa published by CLÀR.

Her collection Transparencies was published in 2013 and featured her first published work to have both Scottish Gaelic and English poems.

Her Scottish Gaelic poetry has appeared in several anthologies, including Other Tongues (1990) and Twenty of the Best (1990). She has also translated poems from Gaelic into English for An Anthology of Scottish Women Poets (1991) and The Harp's Cry (1993).

References

External links
BBC Bio - Làrach nam Bàrd
Meg Bateman at Scottish Poetry Library

1959 births
Academics of the University of Edinburgh
Academics of the University of St Andrews
Living people
Scottish women poets
Scottish women writers
Scottish women academics
Alumni of the University of Aberdeen
Sabhal Mòr Ostaig
21st-century Scottish Gaelic poets
Scottish Gaelic women poets
Scottish Gaelic poets
Translators from Scottish Gaelic